James McMahon may refer to:

Politics
 James McMahon (Canadian politician) (1830–1909), Ontario, Canada doctor and politician
 James Leslie McMahon or Les McMahon (1930–2015), Australian politician
 James O'Brien McMahon or Brien McMahon (1903–1952), United States senator
 Jim McMahon (politician) (born 1980), British politician

Others
 James McMahon (priest) (1817–1901), Irish-born priest
 James McMahon (astronomer), American amateur astronomer
 James McMahon (mathematician) (1856–1922), American educator and mathematician
 James E. McMahon, United States Attorney in South Dakota
 Jim McMahon (born 1959), American football player

See also
 James Macmahon (1865–1954), Irish businessman